James "Jim" Louis Jelinek (born May 9, 1942) was the eighth Bishop of Minnesota in the Episcopal Church (United States) until his retirement on 13 February 2010.

Education and Career
Born and raised in Wisconsin, Jelinek graduated from Carthage College in Kenosha, Wisconsin in 1964, and attended The General Theological Seminary in New York City, graduating in 1970. Between 1964 and 1967, he did some postgraduate studies at Vanderbilt University. He was ordained deacon in 1970, and priest in 1971. He served as assistant rector of St Bartholomew's Church in Nashville, Tennessee between 1971 and 1972, and then program developer of Youth Services in Memphis, Tennessee between 1972 and 1973. In 1972, he also became associate rector of the Church of the Holy Communion in Memphis, serving till 1977. Between 1977 and 1984. he was rector of St Michael and All Angels' Church in Cincinnati, while in 1985, he moved to San Francisco to become rector of St Aidan’s Church.

Episcopacy
Jelenik was consecrated the eighth bishop of Minnesota in 1993. His episcopacy was noted for its focus on immigrants and refugees that began with an outreach to Latinos and to Hmong.

Retirement Years
In retirement, Bishop Jelinek served as interim rector of St. Paul's Episcopal in Washington, D.C. from 2013 to 2015 and in 2019-2020, Trinity Church, Newport, Rhode Island.

See also

 List of Succession of Bishops for the Episcopal Church, USA

External links
The Episcopal Diocese of Minnesota

References

James L. Jelinek VIII Bishop of Minnesota The Diocese of Minnesota

American Episcopalians
American Episcopal priests
Living people
Episcopal bishops of Minnesota
American religious leaders
1942 births
General Theological Seminary alumni
Carthage College alumni
People from Wisconsin